Holmebåen is a point on the tiny island of Steinsøy in an archipelago of small islands northwest of the Utvær islands in the municipality of Solund in Vestland county, Norway. Holmebåen is the westernmost point in Norway proper (not counting the Jan Mayen island).

References

Solund
Landforms of Vestland
Headlands of Norway